William Henry "Skeeter" Barnes (born March 3, 1957) is a retired Major League Baseball utility player for the Cincinnati Reds (1983–1984 and 1989), Montreal Expos (1985), St. Louis Cardinals (1987) and Detroit Tigers (1991–1994).

Biography
Barnes was born in Cincinnati, Ohio. After playing college baseball at his hometown University of Cincinnati, Barnes was selected by the Reds in the 16th round of the 1978 Major League Baseball draft. Barnes worked his way through the minors, earning promotion to the Reds in 1983 after hitting .337 for the Reds' Indianapolis farm club. He made his Major League debut on September 6, 1983 at Candlestick Park and was twice hit by pitch. , he is the only player to be hit by more than one pitch in his debut.

Although Barnes continued to have great success at the Triple-A level for many years, he was unable to find a home in the majors. Between 1984 and 1990, he played in just 60 big-league games, including four for the 1987 National League champion St. Louis Cardinals. In four of those years, he hit .300 or better in the minors.

Barnes finally achieved stable big-league status at the age of 34, when most players have long retired. After hammering International League pitching at a .330 clip through the first two months of the 1991 season, Barnes was called up by the Tigers. A capable fielder at several positions and a good contact hitter, he turned out to be a good fit for the Tigers, which had defensive problems and a lineup that struck out a lot. Barnes spent most of the next three seasons with the Tigers. Detroit fans appreciated his blue-collar work ethic; he was sometimes called "Crash Davis" after the fictional character in the film Bull Durham, who had spent most of his career in the minor leagues.

During all or part of nine seasons in the majors, Barnes played in 353 games with 614 at-bats, 95 runs, 159 hits, 30 doubles, four triples, 14 home runs, 83 RBIs, 20 stolen bases, 41 walks, .259 batting average, .306 on-base percentage, .389 slugging percentage, 239 total bases, eight sacrifice hits, eight sacrifice flies, and three intentional walks. In the minor leagues, Barnes batted .296 for his career and had 1,773 career hits. At the time, he ranked as one of the all-time leading hitters in the minor leagues.

He retired as a player following the 1994 season, and was active in the game as a minor-league coach and manager. Barnes' post-playing jobs have included a stint as manager of the Southwest Michigan Devil Rays of the Midwest League in 2006, two coaching stints in the Midwest League (1997–98 and 2005), coaching in the Southern League in 2003–04, in the International League (1995–96, 1999), and managing the Lakeland Tigers in 2000. From 2007 to present, Barnes served as the Tampa Bay Rays minor-league outfield and base-running coordinator.

References

External links 

Skeeter Barnes at Baseball Almanac
Sports Pool
Pura Pelota (Venezuelan Winter League)

1957 births
Living people
African-American baseball players
American expatriate baseball players in Canada
Baseball players from Cincinnati
Billings Mustangs players
Buffalo Bisons (minor league) players
Cincinnati Bearcats baseball players
Cincinnati Reds players
Denver Zephyrs players
Detroit Tigers players
Indianapolis Indians players
Jacksonville Expos players
Louisville Redbirds players
Major League Baseball first basemen
Major League Baseball third basemen
Minor league baseball managers
Montreal Expos players
Nashville Sounds players
Navegantes del Magallanes players
American expatriate baseball players in Venezuela
Portland Beavers players
St. Louis Cardinals players
Tiburones de La Guaira players
Toledo Mud Hens players
University of Cincinnati alumni
Waterbury Reds players
Wichita Aeros players
21st-century African-American people
20th-century African-American sportspeople